Territory of Traditional Natural Resource Use, TTNRU is a type of land use and protected areas in Russia, established for protection of the tradition way of life of small-numbered indigenous peoples of Russia that live in Siberia and Russian Far East. Introduced on April 22 1992, they are subject to the Russian federal law of May 7, 2001 (amended on May 26, 2007).

See also
Indigenous Protected Areas
Community Conservation Areas

References

Protected areas of Russia
Nature conservation in Russia
Lands inhabited by indigenous peoples